The Shinzan Kinen (in Japanese: シンザン記念), short for Nikkan Sports Sho Shinzan Kinen, is a Grade III race for three-year-olds in the JRA.

Race Details

The race was named to honor Shinzan, a Japanese racehorse who won the Japanese Triple Crown.

The race is traditionally held at Kyoto Racecourse in January. The first edition of the race was held on "January 15, 1967" in which Taigyo won.

Foreign horses are allowed to enter the race.

Winners since 2014

Past winners

See also
 Horse racing in Japan
 List of Japanese flat horse races

References

Horse races in Japan